Gabriella may refer to:

 Gabriella (given name), a feminine given name
 Gabriella di Vergy, an opera seria by Gaetano Donizetti (1826, revised 1838), and an opera by Mercadante (1828), based on the tragedy Gabrielle de Vergy by Dormont De Belloy (1777)
 355 Gabriella is a Main belt asteroid named for Gabrielle Renaudot Flammarion
 MS Gabriella is a cruiseferry previously known as the M/S Frans Suell
 Gabriella is a variety of tulip.

See also
 Gabriela